The following are the football (soccer) events of the year 1962 throughout the world.

Events
Copa Libertadores 1962: Won by Santos FC after defeating Peñarol on an aggregate score of 3–0.
1962 International Soccer League
League: America-RJ defeated Belenenses 3–1 on aggregate.
Cup: FK Dukla Prague defeated America-RJ, 3–2, on aggregate.

Winners club national championship
 : Club Atlético Boca Juniors
 : Santos
 : Universidad de Chile
 : Ipswich Town
 : Stade de Reims
 : Shelbourne
 : A.C. Milan
 : Chivas Guadalajara
 : Feyenoord Rotterdam
 : Linfield
 : Olimpia Asunción
 : Real Madrid
 : IFK Norrköping
 : Galatasaray S.K.

International tournaments
 African Cup of Nations in Ethiopia (14–21 January  1962)
 
 
 
1962 British Home Championship (7 October 1961 – 11 April 1962)

 FIFA World Cup in Chile (30 May – 17 June 1962)
 
 
 
 1962 Asian Games in Indonesia (25 August – 4 September 1962)

Births

 6 January – Mark Ellis, English club footballer
 11 January – Farkhad Magametov, Uzbekistani international footballer
 12 January – Alfred Schön, German footballer and manager
 21 January – Gabriele Pin, Italian footballer and coach
 23 January – Stephen Keshi, Nigerian international footballer (died 2016)
 26 January – Marco Antonio Barrero, Bolivian international footballer
 5 February – Felipe Peralta, Paraguayan international footballer
 13 February – Héctor Morán, Uruguayan international footballer
 9 March – Jan Furtok, Polish international footballer
 16 March – Lars Larsson, Swedish international footballer and coach (died 2015)
 30 March
 Dariusz Raczyński, Polish footballer (died 2022)
 Gary Stevens, English football player and manager
 13 April 
 Edivaldo, Brazilian footballer (died 1993)
 Nelson Gutiérrez, Uruguayan footballer
 26 April – Colin Anderson, English club footballer
 4 June – Per Frimann, Danish footballer
 14 July – Patricio Toledo, Chilean international footballer
 17 July – Patricio Mardones, Chilean footballer
 18 August – Hólger Quiñónez, Ecuadorian footballer
 1 September
 Tony Cascarino, Irish footballer
 Ruud Gullit, Dutch international footballer and manager
 6 September – Holger Fach, German international footballer and manager
 10 September – Wiljan Vloet, Dutch football manager
 17 September – Luis Caballero, Paraguayan international footballer (died 2005)
 30 September – Frank Rijkaard, Dutch international footballer and manager
 1 October – Attaphol Buspakom, Thai international footballer and coach (died 2015)
 26 October – Wilbert Suvrijn, Dutch international footballer
 30 October – Stefan Kuntz, German international footballer
 12 November – Wim Kieft, Dutch international footballer
 15 November – Kim Vilfort, Danish international footballer
 20 November
Paul Birch, English club footballer (died 2009)
Chris Foy, English referee
 8 December – Berry van Aerle, Dutch international footballer
 10 December – John de Wolf, Dutch footballer

Deaths

 28 March – David Wijnveldt, Dutch international footballer (born 1891)
 20 October – Jesús Herrera, Spanish international footballer (born 1938)

References

 
Association football by year